Big Bang 03 (also known as Big Bang Third Single) is the third single album by the South Korean boy band Big Bang, released under YG Entertainment on November 21, 2006. It spawned the single "Forever with You", featuring Park Bom who was also featured on their debut single track "We Belong Together" released in August. Big Bang 03 was released two months after their second single album Big Bang Is V.I.P. Like its two predecessors, it was able to chart for a long time before it dropped from the monthly album charts in South Korea.

Track listing

Charts and sales

Monthly charts

Yearly charts

Sales

Release history

References

External links
Big Bang Official Site

BigBang (South Korean band) albums
2006 albums
YG Entertainment albums
Korean-language albums
Single albums
Albums produced by G-Dragon